Ulric de Fonvielle, brother of Wilfrid de Fonvielle, (11 February 1833, Paris – 1 July 1911, Paris) was a 19th-century French journalist and writer.

Biography 
After studying painting, he took part as a volunteer to the expedition of the Thousand in 1860 then, as a reporter, to the American civil war.

Chief editor of La Ligne Directe in Dieppe (1868), he actively participated to the campaign against the Empire led by La Marseillaise of Henri Rochefort. On January 10, 1870, he was chosen as a witness by their colleague Paschal Grousset for Victor Noir to attend the duel between Noir and Prince Pierre Bonaparte and accused the Pronce of attempted murder on his person after the death of Victor Noir: Assassin , dare to face me! You cowardly murdered my friend, assassin, assassin! To death ! He then got ten days in jail for insulting the Court.

In April 1870, he was candidate to the Paris Commune

Works 
1861: Souvenirs d'une chemise rouge 
1865: Lincoln, 1806-1865 
1878: Populus, drama in five acts and huit tableaux, with Eugène Hubert
1879: Le Puits du diable

Bibliography 
 Jules Claretie, Histoire de la révolution de 1870-71, 1872, read online on Gallica

References

External links 
 Ulric de Fonvieille on Data.bnf.fr  
 Idref
 Ulric de Fonvielle's grave at Père Lachaise Cemetery

French political journalists
19th-century French journalists
French male journalists
1833 births
Writers from Paris
1911 deaths
Burials at Père Lachaise Cemetery
19th-century French male writers